Piz Mezzaun (western summit: 2,963 m, eastern summit: 3,000 m) is a mountain in the Livigno Range of the Alps, located east of La Punt Chamues-ch in the canton of Graubünden. It lies on the range north of the Chamuera valley.

References

External links
 Piz Mezzaun on Hikr
 Panoramas of the Piz Mezzaun

Mountains of the Alps
Mountains of Switzerland
Mountains of Graubünden
Two-thousanders of Switzerland
La Punt Chamues-ch